Limosinella is a genus of flies belonging to the family Lesser Dung flies.

Species
L. munda (Collin, 1912)

References

Sphaeroceridae
Diptera of Africa
Brachycera genera